Ischnaspis is a genus of armored scale insects in the family Diaspididae. There are about seven described species in Ischnaspis.

Species
These seven species belong to the genus Ischnaspis:
 Ischnaspis ghesquierei Matile-Ferrero, 1982
 Ischnaspis longirostris (Signoret, 1882)
 Ischnaspis macrolobii Laing, 1932
 Ischnaspis remaudierei Matile-Ferrero, 1982
 Ischnaspis silvestrii Leonardi, 1914
 Ischnaspis spathulata Lindinger, 1911
 Ischnaspis tecleae Ben-Dov, 1974

References

Lepidosaphidini
Sternorrhyncha genera